Material Thangz is the second album by The Deele. Released in 1985 on the SOLAR Records label, which was distributed by Elektra/Asylum Records, a division of Warner Bros. Records. It was produced by L.A. Reid. It's notable for the composition "Sweet November", composed by then-member Kenneth "Babyface" Edmonds, who also sung lead vocals on the composition. The song was later covered by R&B group Troop, who turned the song into a #1 R&B hit in 1992.

Track listing
"Let's Work Tonight"   (Edmonds)  	
"Stimulate"   (Bristol, Edmonds, Reid, Roberson)	
"You're All I've Ever Known"   (Edmonds) 	
"Suspicious"  (Edmonds, Greene, Reid, Roberson)	
"Material Thangz"   (Edmonds, Greene, Reid, Roberson, Simmons)
"I'll Send You Roses"  (Edmonds, Oates) 	
"Sweet November"   (Edmonds) 	
"Sweet Nothingz"   (Bristol, Roberson)

Personnel
 Babyface - Vocals
 Carlos - Vocals, Vocals (Background)
 Dee - Percussion, Vocals
 Karen Flowers - Vocals (Background)
 Sonya Flowers - Vocals (Background)
 Victoria Forman - Vocals (Background)
 Reggie Griffin - Guitar
 Debra Hurd - Vocals
 Kayo - Guitar (Bass), Percussion, Synthesizer, Vocals
 Kenny E. - Guitar, Keyboards, Vocals
 L.A. Reid - Drums, Percussion, Programming
 Daryl Simmons - Percussion, Vocals (Background)
 Demorris Smith - Synthesizer

References

External links
 The Deele-Material Thangz  at Discogs

1985 albums
SOLAR Records albums
Elektra Records albums
Asylum Records albums
Soul albums by American artists
Albums produced by L.A. Reid